Amblytelus geoffreyorum is a species of Psydrinae in the genus Amblytelus. It was described by Baehr in 2004.

References 

Amblytelus
Beetles described in 2004